The Cabinet of Afghanistan is the administrative body of the government of Afghanistan, responsible for day-to-day governance and the implementation of policy set by the Leadership. It is headed by the prime minister—who serves as the nation's head of government—and his deputies, and consists of the heads and deputy heads of the government ministries.

Islamic Emirate (2021–present)
Following the fall of Kabul to Taliban Forces on 15 August 2021, tentative nominations to the cabinet were announced in late August 2021.

The Taliban said in early September 2021 that women would not be allowed to "work in high-ranking posts" in the government and "ruled out" women in the cabinet. On 24 August 2021, Fawzia Koofi, a former member of the Afghan National Assembly, had said that a men-only government would "not be complete". Early September street protests by women in Herat and Kabul called for women to be included in the new government.

A men-only "caretaker cabinet" was appointed by Supreme Leader Hibatullah Akhundzada on 7 September 2021. BBC News stated that the Ministry of Women's Affairs appeared to have been abolished. Another two veterans were named two weeks later as deputies. Afghanistan's main political parties objected to the choice of acting Cabinet members as non-inclusive, with Jamiat-e Islami describing it as "more monopolist and extremist in politics and power than the previous imposed leaders", and Atta Muhammad Nur seeing it as a "sign of hegemony, monopoly and a return to the past".

As of 29 January 2022, no other country had formally recognized the Islamic Emirate of Afghanistan as the de jure government of Afghanistan.

Islamic Republic (2004–2021)
From the 2001 United States invasion of Afghanistan through to the August 2021 Fall of Kabul, Afghanistan had interim and transitional administrations, followed by cabinets of the Islamic Republic of Afghanistan starting in 2004. These are listed below from latest to earliest.

During the Islamic Republic of Afghanistan, the president selected the members of cabinet with the approval of the National Assembly. Candidates for a ministerial position had to be an Afghan citizen, be at least 35 years of age and have higher education. Ministers, unlike the president and vice presidents, could have citizenship of another country, although in 2017 the Wolesi Jirga had rejected ministers who had dual citizenship.

Second Ghani Cabinet (2019–Aug 2021)

First Ghani Cabinet (National Unity Government; 2015–2019)

Karzai administration 2009–2014

After winning a second term, President Hamid Karzai nominated 23 ministers in December 2009 to be part of his new administration but only 7 were approved by the National Assembly. All the other candidates that Karzai initially selected were rejected by members of the National Assembly. Karzai presented a second list of 18 candidates to the Wolesi Jirga on 9 January 2010. A week later, the Wolesi Jirga again approved only seven of the candidates. Since then, part of the ministries have been governed by acting ministers who do not held approval of the Afghan legislature.

In June 2010, after the resignation of Interior Minister Hanif Atmar, President Karzai submitted 7 names for a third round of confirmation in the National Assembly. Five of them were approved by the National Assembly, leaving only six of the 25 ministries left with an 'acting minister.' In the line chart below is the list of members of the current Afghan Cabinet (2009–2014).

Karzai administration 2004–2009

In the line chart below is the list of members of the Afghan Cabinet from 2004 to 2009.

Afghan Interim Administration and Afghan Transitional Administration (2001–2004)

Afghan Transitional Administration (2002–2004)

The Bonn conference of December 2001 had installed an interim government, the 2002 Loya Jirga subsequently elected a transitional administration. From July 2002 until the presidential elections in October 2004, the Transitional Administration governed Afghanistan.

Afghan interim administration (Dec 2001–Jul 2002)

Following the late 2001 ouster of the Taliban regime approximately two dozen leading Afghans met in Germany at the Bonn Conference to choose a leadership and set in place a timeline for the adoption of a new constitution for a new Afghan government, and the timeline for choosing an executive and legislature by democratic election. In the chart below is the list of members of the Interim Afghan authority. The Afghan Interim Administration (AIA) was the first administration of Afghanistan after the fall of the Taliban regime and was the highest authority of the country from 22 December 2001 until 13 July 2002.

Islamic Emirate (1996–2001)

This government was only recognized by Pakistan, Saudi Arabia and the United Arab Emirates, though Pakistan and the United Emirates later withdrew their recognition after the September 11 attacks. All other states continued to recognize the Islamic State of Afghanistan.

References

Executive branch of the government of Afghanistan
Afghanistan
Current governments